Carlton in Lindrick is a village and civil parish about  north of Worksop in Nottinghamshire, England. The 2011 Census recorded a parish population of 5,623, including nearby Wallingwells.

Toponyms
"Carlton", a common English place name, derives from the Old English for "kings' town" or "freemen's town". "Lindrick", denoting the land of the linden or lime tree is the name of the ancient district, most of which is now in South Yorkshire.

Places of worship
St John the Evangelist's Church is an 11th-century late Saxon building with Norman, 15th-century Perpendicular Gothic and 19th-century Gothic Revival additions. St John's is the most important surviving Saxon or Saxon-Norman building in Nottinghamshire and a Grade I listed building. There is a service every Sunday morning at 10.30.

The Wesleyan chapel built in Carlton in 1861 now serves Carlton Methodist Church, as part of the Trinity Methodist Circuit. A service is held every Sunday at 10.45 am.

Wallingwells Priory
In the reign of King Stephen (1135–41) a Norman landholder, Ralph de Chevrolcourt (or Caprecuria) founded and endowed a Benedictine priory of nuns in Carlton Park. It seems to have been built in 1140–1144. The priory was next to a spring ("juxta fontes et rivum fontium") called Wallingwells and dedicated to St Mary the Virgin. Formally it was called St Mary in the Park, but it was generally known as the Priory of Wallingwells.

By 1262 the priory had certain rights in Carlton's parish church of St John the Evangelist, and also the parish churches of St Wilfrid's Church, Cantley, South Yorkshire and All Saints, Mattersey. The nuns were very poor when Godfrey Ludham, Archbishop of York, granted the priory 18 bovates of land in Carlton parish, and remained poor, so that in 1273 St Wilfrid's Cantley and its tithe income were appropriated as well. Archbishop Godfrey's successor, Walter Giffard, assented to the grant and commended the devoutness of the nuns. A Taxation Roll of 1291 records the Priory as holding temporalities at "Handsworth Woodhouses".

Henry VIII's Valor Ecclesiasticus of 1535 records the priory as holding not only its rectories of Carlton and Cantley and land at Handsworth, but lands at Gildingwells, Gringley and "Willourne". In 1536 the King's agents, Thomas Legh and Richard Layton, visited the priory and found no slander or scandal to report against it. It was a small religious house and so was to have been dissolved under the Suppression of Religious Houses Act 1535, Parliament's first act for the Dissolution of the Monasteries. However, the prioress, Margaret Goldsmith, bought off the Crown officials with a payment equal to the priory's income for more than a year.

In June 1537 Goldsmith demised the priory and its estates to a Richard Oglethorp for 21 years, retaining only the priory church and buildings for the nuns to use. Two years later Parliament passed the Suppression of Religious Houses Act 1539. In December of that year the Wallingwells Priory surrendered to the Crown, which pensioned off the prioress, her sub-prioress and seven other nuns. No visible remains of the priory survive.

The Carlton-in-Lindrick knight is a 12th-century, mounted bronze figurine 6 cm high discovered in 2004 and now displayed in the Bassetlaw Museum, Retford.

Notable person
Kathleen Scott, Baroness Kennet, English sculptor (born Kathleen Bruce, 1878–1947), was born in Carlton as the youngest child of the Anglican rector. She married Captain Robert Falcon Scott, Antarctic explorer, and was mother to the artist, ornithologist and painter Peter Scott. Her son by her second husband, politician and writer Hilton Young, 1st Baron Kennet, was Wayland Young, 2nd Baron Kennet, also a politician and writer.

Amenities

Carlton has a civic centre. There is also a public library in Long Lane, which currently opens on Monday afternoons and Friday mornings.

There is a doctors' surgery in Long Lane.

The village had four pubs: the Blue Bell, The Grey Horses Inn, the Sherwood Ranger and the Riddle Arms. Three remain, as the Riddle Arms closed in 2017 and now houses a nursery. Information on other catering facilities appears here:

Carlton Mill is a privately owned 19th-century corn mill, water-powered with an auxiliary steam engine. It is now operated only at annual flower shows.

Public transport
Carlton is served by the 22 bus route between Worksop and Doncaster. It runs half-hourly on Mondays to Saturdays and hourly on Sundays. The nearest railway station is Shireoaks (4 miles/6.4 km) on the Sheffield–Lincoln line, which offers an hourly service on Mondays to Saturdays and a two-hourly service on Sunday afternoons.

References

Bibliography

 
Villages in Nottinghamshire
Civil parishes in Nottinghamshire
Bassetlaw District